Fortinbras is a 1991 play by American playwright Lee Blessing. Set immediately following William Shakespeare's Hamlet, the play recounts the events after Hamlet's death that go on throughout Elsinore. The play includes almost every character from Hamlet returning as a ghost.

Production
Fortinbras opened on 18 June 1991 at the La Jolla Playhouse.

Crew

Cast

References

Sources

Plays by Lee Blessing
Plays and musicals based on Hamlet
1991 plays